The 2009 Kehoe Cup was an inter-county and colleges hurling competition in the province of Leinster. The competition is ranked below the Walsh Cup and features second and third tier counties from Leinster, Ulster, Connacht and selected university teams. The winners were Westmeath who defeated Carlow 0–16 to 0–09 in the final.

Kehoe Cup

First round

Quarter-finals

Semi-finals

Final

Kehoe shield
The Kehoe Shield was also held for the first time in 2009. Participating teams consisted of those teams knocked out of the first round of the Kehoe Cup. The eventual winners were Kildare.

References

Kehoe Cup
Kehoe Cup